Thrums is an unincorporated community on the northwest shore of the Kootenay River in the West Kootenay region of southeastern British Columbia.

Name origin
J.M. Barrie, Peter Pan author, also wrote Auld Licht Idylls, A Window in Thrums, and The Little Minister, set in the fictional Scottish village of Thrums. In 1900, the second book in the trilogy gave Thrums, BC, a railway switch, its name. The suggested proponent/s are Robert W. and Janie A.S. Chalmers (a farming couple who settled around this time), an unknown female train passenger, or the daughter of an unspecified Canadian Pacific Railway (CP) director.

Railway
CP's adding of this Columbia and Kootenay Railway siding to the timetable in 1900 may have been merely as a designated siding. Passenger service ended in 1964.

Early community
Fruit growing was initially the main industry, which transformed to farming over time. The Chalmers, longtime residents from Scotland, also raised poultry. A general store opened in the 1910s. Becoming predominantly a Doukhobor community, the Thrums Cemetery opened in 1912. Operated by the Union of Spiritual Communities of Christ (USCC) from 1940 until the 1970s, the site is now disused and overgrown. Several stores operated by the 1940s. The Chalmers ran a small store and tea room called The Window from the early 1940s.

The population was about 150 by 1928, 250 by 1934, 174 by 1939, 387 by 1943, 250 by 1946, and 218 by 1951. The post office, which opened in 1906, did not reopen after burning down in 1978.

Freedomites
Various incidents linked to the Freedomites:
1930: Attempted arson of community hall and damage by explosives to school.
1932: Parading in nude prompted 118 arrests and three-year sentences.
1938: Church burned.
1946: Doukhobor hall destroyed by fire.
1947: Barns burned.
1958: Nearby gas pipeline dynamited.
1959: Three feet of CP track dynamited.

Present community
A market/deli and small businesses operate. Since Thrums can be used as a generic name for the area that stretches north to Glade, the boundary with Tarrys is unclear.

Notable people
Joe Irving (1911–2015), author, ironworker activist, graduated high school in his 90s, and centenarian, was the first baby born in Thrums.

Footnotes

References

Settlements in British Columbia
Populated places in the West Kootenay